The 1968–69 Oakland Oaks season was the 2nd and final season of the Oaks of the ABA. The Oaks finished first in the Western Division and won their first and only ABA title. They were helped in part by the hiring of Alex Hannum and Rick Barry for $85,000 per year.

In the ABA Western Division Semifinals, they defeated the Denver Rockets in seven games. In the ABA Western Division Finals, they swept the previous Division Champion, the New Orleans Buccaneers, in four games. Lastly, they beat the Indiana Pacers in five games to secure the title.

However, the team operated at a loss. Despite being owned by singer Pat Boone, S. Kenneth Davidson and Dennis A. Murphy, the team lost money due to the proximity of the San Francisco Warriors. Despite winning the title, the team moved to Washington to become the Washington Caps.

Roster
11 Larry Brown (Point guard, University of North Carolina)
12 Henry Logan (Point guard, Western Carolina University)
14 Russ Critchfield (Point guard, University of California)
24 Rick Barry (Small forward, University of Miami)
30 Gary Bradds (Power forward, Ohio State University)
31 Warren Jabali (Shooting guard, Wichita State University)
32 John Clawson (Small forward, University of Michigan)
33 Ira Harge (Center, University of New Mexico)
34 Doug Moe (Small forward, University of North Carolina)
40 Mel Peterson (Shooting guard, Wheaton College)
42 Jim Eakins (Center, Brigham Young University)
44 Andrew Anderson (Guard, Canisius College)

Bold indicates the player was on the final roster prior to the playoffs.

Season standings

Playoffs
Western Division Semifinals

Oaks win series, 4–3

Division Finals

Oaks win series, 4–0

ABA Finals

Oaks win series, 4–1
For scoring 21.5 points per game with 9.7 rebounds per game during the playoffs, Warren Jabali was named Playoffs MVP.

Awards, records, and honors
1969 ABA All-Star Game
Doug Moe
Larry Brown
Rick Barry

References

External links

Oakland
American Basketball Association championship seasons